Lower Snug is a rural residential locality in the local government area (LGA) of Kingborough in the Hobart LGA region of Tasmania. The 2016 census recorded a population of 442 for the state suburb of Lower Snug.

History 
Lower Snug was gazetted as a locality in 1972.

Geography
The waters of North-West Bay form part of the northern boundary.

Road infrastructure 
Route B68 (Channel Highway) runs through from north to south.

References

Towns in Tasmania
Localities of Kingborough Council